Points North Landing Airport  is a regional airport adjacent to Points North Landing in Saskatchewan, Canada.

See also 
 List of airports in Saskatchewan
 Points North Landing Water Aerodrome

References 

Certified airports in Saskatchewan